Cantrainea is a genus of sea snails, marine gastropod mollusks in the family Colloniidae.

Species
Species within the genus Cantrainea include:
 Cantrainea alfi S.-I Huang, I-F. Fu & Poppe, 2016
 Cantrainea boswellae (Barnard, 1969)
 Cantrainea gibbula (Thiele, 1925) 
 Cantrainea globuloides (Dautzenberg & H. Fischer, 1896) 
 Cantrainea indica (E. A. Smith, 1894)
 Cantrainea inexpectata (Marshall, 1979) 
 Cantrainea jamsteci (Okutani & Fujikura, 1990)
 Cantrainea macleani Warén & Bouchet, 1993
 Cantrainea nuda Okutani, 2001
 Cantrainea panamensis (Dall, 1908)
 Cantrainea peloritana (Cantraine, 1835) 
 Cantrainea philipiana (Dall, 1889)
 Cantrainea sunderlandi (Petuch, 1987)
 Cantrainea tosaensis (Habe, 1953)
 Cantrainea yoyottei Vilvens, 2001
Species brought into synonymy
 Cantrainea bicarinata (Martens, 1902): synonym of Cinysca bicarinata (E. von Martens, 1902)
 Cantrainea indicus (E. A. Smith, 1894): synonym of Cantrainea indica (E. A. Smith, 1894)

References

 Okutani, T. & Fujikura, K. (1990). A new turbinid gastropod collected from the warm seep site in the Minami-Ensei Knoll, west of the Amami-Oshima Island, Japan. Venus 49(2): 83–91.
 Gofas, S.; Le Renard, J.; Bouchet, P. (2001). Mollusca, in: Costello, M.J. et al. (Ed.) (2001). European register of marine species: a check-list of the marine species in Europe and a bibliography of guides to their identification. Collection Patrimoines Naturels, 50: pp. 180–213
 Warén A. & Bouchet P. (1993) New records, species, genera, and a new family of gastropods from hydrothermal vents and hydrocarbon seeps. Zoologica Scripta 22: 1-90

External links
 Jeffreys J.G. 1883. On the Mollusca procured during the 'Lightning' and 'Porcupine' expeditions 1868-70. (Part VI). Proceedings of the Zoological Society of London, 1882: 88-149, pl. 19, 20
 Kaim, A.; Jenkins, R. G.; Hikida, Y. (2009). Gastropods from Late Cretaceous Omagari and Yasukawa hydrocarbon seep deposits in the Nakagawa area, Hokkaido, Japan. Acta Palaeontologica Polonica. 54(3): 463-490
 Marshall, B. A. (1979). The Trochidae and Turbinidae of the Kermadec Ridge (Mollusca: Gastropoda). New Zealand Journal of Zoology. 6: 521-552

Colloniidae
Taxa named by John Gwyn Jeffreys
Gastropod genera